Unit:187 is the debut studio album of Unit:187, released on February 6, 1996, by 21st Circuitry.

Reception

Allmusic awarded Unit:187 three out of five possible stars. Fabryka Music Magazine lauded the album's dynamic presentation of noise in using a fusion of guitar and drum driven aggression with trance like music. Black Monday credited the album's diverse range of emotions and said the band explore the "heart of a grinding aural firehouse, obliterating most watered-down "industrial" that has been flooding the market as of late."

Aiding & Abetting gave Unit:187 a mixed reception, noting that the band's misdirection in experimentation leaves the music feeling dull but credited the album for comprising "nicely experimental industrial stuff that doesn't mind mixing it up with the heaviest of elements." Sonic Boom praised the band's inventive approach to speed metal, describing them as "what may be the first electronic thrash outfit," but criticized the tone of the lyrics as hindering to the depth of the music.

Track listing

Personnel
Adapted from the Unit:187 liner notes.

Unit:187
 Tod Law – lead vocals, cover art
 John Morgan – electronics, programming, production
 Ashley Scribner – guitar, sampler

Production and design
 Matteo Caratozzolo – production, recording, mixing and editing (1, 2, 4–7, 9–11)
 John Fyssas – recording, mixing and editing (3, 8)
 Pierre Internoscia – cover art
 Sub.Tech – illustrations

Release history

References

External links 
 Unit:187 at Discogs (list of releases)

1995 debut albums
Unit:187 albums
21st Circuitry albums